Mashuna upemba is a butterfly in the family Nymphalidae. It is found in north-eastern Angola, the Democratic Republic of the Congo and south-western Tanzania. The habitat consists of marshy areas and open, grassy glades at high altitudes.

References

Satyrini
Butterflies of Africa
Butterflies described in 1955